Pennsylvania Railroad Old Bridge over Standing Stone Creek, also known as Conrail Old Bridge over Standing Stone Creek, is a historic multi-span stone arch bridge spanning Standing Stone Creek and located at Huntingdon, Huntingdon County, Pennsylvania.  It was built by the Pennsylvania Railroad between 1848 and 1850.  It was in use until 1892, when the main line was relocated onto the former Pennsylvania Canal bed. A second stone arch bridge was constructed nearby for the new alignment.

It was added to the National Register of Historic Places in 1990.

See also
List of bridges documented by the Historic American Engineering Record in Pennsylvania

References

External links

Railroad bridges on the National Register of Historic Places in Pennsylvania
Bridges completed in 1850
Bridges in Huntingdon County, Pennsylvania
Historic American Engineering Record in Pennsylvania
National Register of Historic Places in Huntingdon County, Pennsylvania
Stone arch bridges in the United States
Pennsylvania Railroad bridges